The 1996 Rover British Clay Court Championships was a women's tennis tournament played on outdoor clay courts in Cardiff in Wales that was part of Tier IV of the 1996 WTA Tour. It was the second edition of the tournament and was held from 14 to 19 May 1996. Fifth-seeded Dominique Van Roost won the singles title.

Finals

Singles

 Dominique Van Roost defeated  Laurence Courtois 6–4, 6–2
 It was Van Roost's only title of the year and the 2nd of her career.

Doubles

 Katrina Adams /  Mariaan de Swardt defeated  Els Callens /  Laurence Courtois 6–0, 6–4
 It was Adams' 2nd title of the year and the 19th of her career. It was de Swardt's only title of the year and the 2nd of her career.

References

External links
 ITF tournament edition details

Rover British Clay Court Championships
British Hard Court Championships
Rover British Clay Court Championships
Rover British Clay Court Championships
Tennis tournaments in Wales